The Northern Plains Railroad  is a short line railroad that operates over  of track in the northern U.S. state of Minnesota and the northern U.S. state of North Dakota.

The railroad interchanges with the Canadian Pacific Railway in Kenmare, North Dakota and Thief River Falls, Minnesota; the Minnesota Northern Railroad in Thief River Falls, Minnesota; and the BNSF Railway in Ardoch, North Dakota.

The railroad has its headquarters in Fordville, North Dakota, where it operates its largest yard facility, and also has a field office located in Lansford, North Dakota, where it operates another large yard and roundhouse.

As of 2006, the Northern Plains Railroad employed 43 people and handled approximately 17,000 carloads per year. The primary commodities hauled included wheat, barley, durum, and soybeans.

History

Formation 
The Northern Plains Railroad was formed in January 1997 after the Soo Line Railroad, under control as a subsidiary of the Canadian Pacific Railway, decided to lease  of branch line trackage in Minnesota and North Dakota.

The track originally leased to the railroad consisted of the  Devils Lake Subdivision between Thief River Falls, Minnesota, and Harlow, North Dakota, and the  Bisbee Subdivision between Fordville, North Dakota, and Kenmare, North Dakota. The two lines formed the Soo Line Railroad's so-called "wheatline" that served as a connection between its main line from Glenwood, Minnesota, to Noyes, Minnesota, (and on to Winnipeg, Manitoba, via the Canadian Pacific) and its main line from Glenwood, Minnesota, to Portal, North Dakota, (and on to Moose Jaw, Saskatchewan, via the Canadian Pacific).

Before coming under control of the BNSF Railway, the Sarles Subdivision had been owned by the Burlington Northern Railroad and, before that, by the Great Northern Railway. The line was one of the latter railroad's many branch lines built in the early twentieth century to serve communities in northern North Dakota

Merger 
In 2000 and 2001 the Mohall Central Railroad and the Northern Plains Railroad teamed up to begin operating track sold by the BNSF Railway. The Mohall Central Railroad agreed to purchase and then let the Northern Plains Railroad operate over both a  portion of the Drayton Subdivision between Honeyford, North Dakota, and Voss, North Dakota, and a  portion of the Granville Subdivision between milepost 5.25 (north of Granville, North Dakota) and Mohall, North Dakota.

In the fall of 2005, the Northern Plains Railroad and the Mohall Central Railroad came together once more to begin operations over a  portion of the BNSF Railway’s Sarles Subdivision between milepost 3.75 (north of Lakota, North Dakota) and Sarles, North Dakota. The BNSF Railway agreed to sell its track to the Mohall Central Railroad. In turn, the Mohall Central Railroad agreed to let the Northern Plains Railroad begin operating over the line. Connecting track near Munich, North Dakota, where the Sarles Subdivision crosses the Bisbee Subdivision, was also put in place.

Cutbacks 
After the Mohall Central Railroad purchased the Granville Subdivision, it quickly abandoned a  portion of it between milepost 5.25 and milepost 35.00 (at Forfar siding south of Lansford, North Dakota). The part of the subdivision still in service, was then renamed the Mohall Subdivision. Likewise, the portion of the Drayton Subdivision that the Mohall Central Railroad had also acquired was renamed the Gilby Subdivision. The portion of the line between Forest River, North Dakota and Voss, North Dakota would later be abandoned.
 
Both portions of track purchased by the Mohall Central Railroad had been owned by the Burlington Northern Railroad before coming under ownership of the BNSF Railway. Before that, the Mohall Subdivision had formed a  branch line on the Great Northern Railway that stretched from Granville, North Dakota to Sherwood, North Dakota. The Gilby Subdivision, on the other hand, had formed the Northern Pacific Railway’s  main line from Manitoba Junction, Minnesota (near Hawley, Minnesota) to Winnipeg, Manitoba.

In October 2004, the Northern Plains Railroad—acting through its parent, the Soo Line Railroad—abandoned a  portion of the Devils Lake Subdivision between Harlow, North Dakota and Devils Lake, North Dakota. Part of the roadbed had become submerged in the steadily increasing water level of Devils Lake.

In December 2009, the Northern Plains Railroad—again acting through the Soo Line Railroad—abandoned  of the Bisbee Subdivision between Bisbee, North Dakota and Kramer, North Dakota.

Locomotive and freight car fleet

The Northern Plains Railroad operates around 25 locomotives, mostly largely rebuilt EMD GP35s of various heritages.

The railroad’s official paint scheme contains yellow and navy blue colors arranged in much the same way as the colors on the "yellowbonnets" that once operated on the Atchison, Topeka and Santa Fe Railway were arranged. The words Northern Plains are spelled out on both the nose and the long hood. Many of the locomotives operating on the Northern Plains Railroad continue to wear the colors of their former owners. This includes at least four former Union Pacific Railroad EMD SD40T-2 locomotives.

Most of the freight cars that the Northern Plains Railroad uses are provided by the Canadian Pacific Railway, while the rest are provided by the BNSF Railway and Minnesota Northern Railroad.

Northern Plains rail services

The Northern Plains Railroad also operates a railcar repair and locomotive repainting facility in Fordville, North Dakota under the name Northern Plains Rail Services. The facility contracts with other railroads, shippers, industries, processors, owners, and lessors to make either small-scale or large-scale repairs to freight cars or provide new paint to locomotives. Some of the past locomotive repainting customers have included the Canadian Pacific Railway and the Belt Railway of Chicago.

Stations on the Northern Plains Railroad

The Bisbee Subdivision
 Fordville, North Dakota
 Lankin, North Dakota
 Adams, North Dakota
 Fairdale, North Dakota
 Nekoma, North Dakota
 Loma, North Dakota
 Alsen, North Dakota
 Calio, North Dakota
 Egeland, North Dakota
 Arndt, North Dakota
 Bisbee, North Dakota (also a BNSF station)
 Kramer, North Dakota
 Russell, North Dakota
 Eckman, North Dakota
 Hurd, North Dakota
 Lansford, North Dakota
 Chola, North Dakota
 Grano, North Dakota
 Greene, North Dakota
 Tolley, North Dakota
 Norma, North Dakota
 Kenmare, North Dakota (also a Canadian Pacific station)

The Devils Lake Subdivision
 Thief River Falls, Minnesota (also a Canadian Pacific and Minnesota Northern station)
 Rosewood, Minnesota
 Viking, Minnesota
 Radium, Minnesota
 Warren, Minnesota (also a BNSF station)
 March, Minnesota
 Alvarado, Minnesota
 Oslo, Minnesota
 Poland, North Dakota
 Ardoch, North Dakota (also a BNSF station)
 Forest River, North Dakota
 Ops, North Dakota
 Conway, North Dakota (also a BNSF station)
 Fordville, North Dakota
 Dahlen, North Dakota
 Whitman, North Dakota
 Pelto, North Dakota
 Southam, North Dakota
 Rohrville, North Dakota
 Essex, North Dakota
 Devils Lake, North Dakota (also a BNSF station)

The Gilby Subdivision
 Forest River, North Dakota
 Johnstown, North Dakota
 Gilby, North Dakota
 Honeyford, North Dakota

The Mohall Subdivision
 Lansford, North Dakota
 Truro, North Dakota
 Mohall, North Dakota

The Sarles Subdivision
 Munich, North Dakota
 Clyde, North Dakota
 Calvin, North Dakota
 Sarles, North Dakota

References

External links

 Official Northern Plains Railroad website Includes a system map of the Northern Plains Railroad
 Northern Plains Railroad from the University of Minnesota Railroad Club's Minnesota Railroad Guide (this link includes photos of the Northern Plains Railroad's equipment)

Minnesota railroads
North Dakota railroads
Regional railroads in the United States
Spin-offs of the Canadian Pacific Railway